Edward Goff Penny (15 May 1820 – 11 October 1881) was an English-Canadian journalist, businessman, and politician.

Born in Islington (now part of London), England, Penny moved to Canada in 1844, settling in Montreal, Quebec and joined the Montreal Herald as a reporter. At the same time he studied law and in 1850 was admitted to the Lower Canadian bar, though he never practised law as a profession. Penny would become editor-in-chief and a co-owner of the newspaper, taking it to "its height of success".  He was the first president of the Parliamentary Press Gallery in Ottawa.

In 1874, he was the first newspaper reporter appointed to the Senate of Canada representing the senatorial division of Alma, Quebec. He died in office in 1881.

Arthur G. Penny, the grandson of Edward Goff Penny, died in 1963. His will endowed the Edward Goff Penny Memorial Prizes, in memory of his grandfather. The first prizes were awarded in 1991. The awards are administered by the Canadian Newspaper Association. There are two prizes of $1500 for young journalists between the ages 20 and 25. One is given for newspapers with less than 25,000 circulation; the other is for newspapers with more than 25,000 circulation.

References

External links 
 
 
 

1820 births
1881 deaths
Canadian senators from Quebec
English emigrants to pre-Confederation Quebec
Liberal Party of Canada senators
19th-century Canadian journalists
Canadian male journalists
19th-century Canadian male writers
Immigrants to the Province of Canada
Anglophone Quebec people